AICP may refer to:

 All India Communist Party
 American Institute of Certified Planners, the American Planning Association's professional institute
 Android Ice Cold Project, a custom Android distribution
 Association for Improving the Condition of the Poor, a 19th-century charitable organization in New York City
 Association of Islamic Charitable Projects, an international organization with moderate Islamic principles
 Association of Independent Commercial Producers, an American organization representing commercial media producers

See also
 AICPA, American Institute of Certified Public Accountants